Laurence Manning Academy is a private school in Manning, South Carolina. It was founded as a White-only school shortly after the integration of public schools and remains almost completely White.

History
In 1972, organizers chose the name Laurence Manning after revolutionary war hero Laurence Manning, the grandfather of John Laurence Manning, for whom the town was named. Laurence Manning Academy was first accredited by SCISA in 1973, an organization that was setup to legitimize segregation academies.

In 1979 two students at another private school in Manning burned LMA's main building to the ground.

As of 1990, the IRS had still not granted tax-exempt status to LMA because it was considered a segregated school.

Demographics
As of the 2019-2020 school year, 890 of 927 or 96% of students in Kindergarten through grade 12 were White while 23, or less than 2.5% were Black. The public school district, Clarendon 02, had a student body population that was 47% Black and 46% White.

References

Segregation academies in South Carolina